George Shaw (August 12, 1931 – December 6, 1988) was an American athlete. He competed in the men's triple jump at the 1952 Summer Olympics and the 1956 Summer Olympics.

References

1931 births
1988 deaths
Athletes (track and field) at the 1952 Summer Olympics
Athletes (track and field) at the 1956 Summer Olympics
American male triple jumpers
Olympic track and field athletes of the United States
Place of birth missing